The Israel Atomic Energy Commission (IAEC) is the governmental authority responsible for the State of Israel's activities in the nuclear field.

History
The establishment of the Israel Atomic Energy Commission was announced on 13 June 1952 by Prime Minister David Ben-Gurion. The prime minister appointed Professor Ernst David Bergmann to be its first director-general. Initially the committee was housed in temporary structures near Rehovot and is now located in Ramat Aviv. It oversaw the establishment of the Soreq Nuclear Research Center, the construction of which started in 1958 and the Negev Nuclear Research Center that began construction in late 1959.

Functions
The IAEC advises the government of Israel in areas of nuclear policy and in setting priorities in nuclear research and development. The commission implements governmental policies and represents Israel in international organizations in the nuclear field, such as the International Atomic Energy Agency. The IAEC maintains relationships with relevant national authorities of other countries.

See also
Nuclear weapons and Israel
Nuclear energy in Israel

References

External links
Official site

Nuclear technology in Israel
Governmental nuclear organizations
Government agencies established in 1952
Nuclear regulatory organizations
Israeli nuclear development